Ali Abdulreda Asel (born 28 September 1976) is a former Kuwaiti international footballer who made 60 appearances for the Kuwait national football team.

Asel also represented his country at the 2004 AFC Asian Cup.

International statistics

References

External links 
 
 

1976 births
Living people
Kuwaiti footballers
Kuwait international footballers
Kuwaiti people of Iranian descent
Association football defenders
Asian Games medalists in football
Asian Games silver medalists for Kuwait
Footballers at the 1998 Asian Games
Medalists at the 1998 Asian Games
Kazma SC players
Al Salmiya SC players
Kuwait Premier League players